The Cambridge City School District is a public school district in Guernsey County, Ohio, United States, based in Cambridge, Ohio. The district currently consists of two elementary schools, one middle school, and one high school. The school's colors are blue and white and their mascot is a Bobcat.

Schools
The Cambridge City School District has two elementary schools, one middle school, and one high school.

Elementary schools
 Cambridge Primary School
 Cambridge Intermediate School

Middle school
 Cambridge Middle School

High school
 Cambridge High School

See also
 East Central Ohio ESC

References

External links
 

School districts in Ohio
Education in Guernsey County, Ohio
Cambridge, Ohio